Wanderlust is the tenth studio album by British synth-pop band Blancmange, released in 2018. It was produced by Neil Arthur and Benge, and reached No. 22 on the UK Independent Albums Chart. The single "Not a Priority" features Hannah Peel on backing vocals.

Critical reception

Upon release, Paul Scott-Bates of Louder Than War wrote: "...if anything, this album is potentially [Neil Arthur's] finest work. It is sparse whilst having depth, it is humorous whilst maintaining seriousness, but most importantly of all, it shows a man on the top of his game." Aaron Badgley of The Spill Magazine commented: "Wanderlust is a brilliant album, and it does not sound like any other Blancmange album. Arthur, along with Benge has created a rather dark and at times frightening album. In its darkness, it is quite beautiful."

Nick Smith of MusicOMH considered Wanderlust to be a "brilliant album", containing "dark and inspired comment on modern life". He also felt the album was reminiscent of the 2009 album Yeah Ghost by Zero 7. Patrick Clarke of The Quietus noted: "Wanderlust may be hit and miss, in terms of seizing its own momentum and blending Arthur's left-field writing with its steely electronica, but it shimmers with personality."

Track listing

Personnel
 Neil Arthur – vocals, synthesiser, guitar, percussion, producer, mixing, arrangement, design
 Benge – synthesiser, drum machine, producer, mixing, arrangement
 David Rhodes – guitar (track 8)
 Hannah Peel – backing vocals (track 6)
 Shawn Joseph – mastering

Other
 Paul Agar – design

Charts

References

2018 albums
Blancmange (band) albums